Santiaxis is a monotypic moth genus of the family Erebidae. Its only species, Santiaxis copima, is known from Cuba. Both the genus and the species were first described by William Schaus in 1916.

References

Herminiinae
Monotypic moth genera
Endemic fauna of Cuba